The Battle of Bergen was fought on 19 September 1799 and resulted in a Franco-Dutch victory under Generals Guillaume Brune and Herman Willem Daendels against the Russians and British under the Duke of York who had landed in North Holland. The battlefield is marked by the Russisch Monument (1902).

Order of battle 
The Duke of York landed on 15 September, and assumed the command of the army, which now amounted to about 30,000 men with 1,200 light cavalry. On 19 September the forces, under the Duke of York, formed in four columns, moved forward from Schagerbrug.

At this period the Allies possessed a superiority of force with which it was decided to strike a decisive blow as early as possible.  The Dutch, numbering 12,000, were in a strong position around Langedijk, somewhat in advance of the French, who, by drawing in all detachments, had raised their field strength to 10,000 men, who were positioned in Alkmaar, Bergen, Schoorl, and Egmond aan Zee.

Anglo-Russian Forces 
Prince Frederick, Duke of York and Albany

Battle plan and terrain 
The British and Russian commanders noticed that the Republicans had left their right uncovered, and a very strong position unoccupied. This would have been difficult to correct if the attack on that flank had been vigorously carried out. They had also left Amsterdam undefended on the only side by which it was accessible.

The plan of operations was as follows: The left column was to turn the enemy's right, on the Zuiderzee; the right was to drive the enemy from the heights of Camperduin, and to seize Bergen; the right-centre had to force the position at Warmenhuizen and Schoorldam, and to cooperate with the right column; while the left-centre had to obtain possession of Oudkarspel, on the main road leading to Alkmaar.

The enemy's left was advantageously posted on the high sand hills which extend from the sea, in front of Petten, to the town of Bergen. The ground over which the centre columns had to move was intersected every three or four hundred yards by broad, deep, wet ditches and canals. The bridges across the few roads leading to the points of attack were destroyed, and obstacles had been carefully arranged.

Action 

Contrary to all reasonable expectations, the force under Sir Ralph Abercromby took no direct part in this action; consequently the allied troops engaged amounted to no more than between 15,000 and 18,000 men. The corps under Sir Ralph Abercromby began their march on the evening of 18 September, but his advance was delayed by the bad state of the roads, and he arrived at Hoorn many hours later than was expected. The objectives that would have been gained by this column would have had a material effect on the result of the whole expedition, and could only be attempted while the Duke of York possessed the superior force.

The battle was commenced by Russian forces, which had by 8 am, September 19, obtained possession of Bergen. In vain did they expect support from their British allies, which had not even lined up for the battle, because the British and Russian commanders had neglected to synchronize their clocks. As a result, Russian forces were rapidly encircled by the French, Hermann was made prisoner and his second-in-command Jerepsoff killed, while their troops were forced back through Bergen to Schoorl, which they also had to abandon.

This village was retaken by Major-General Manners’ Brigade, which was then reinforced by two battalions of Russians, by Major-General D’Oyley's Brigade of Guards, and by the 35th Regiment, under Prince William. The action was renewed by these troops, who in their turn repulsed the enemy; but a lack of ammunition and the exhausted state of the corps engaged in that part of the field obliged them to retire on Petten and the Zijpe Canal.

The column under Lieutenant-General Dundas attacked the village of Warmenhuizen at dawn, where the enemy, with a large force of artillery, was strongly positioned. Three battalions of Russians, under Major-General Sedmoratsky, moving from Krabbendam, gallantly stormed the left of the village, with the 1st Regiment of Guards entering it on the right at the same time. The Grenadier battalion of Guards, the 3rd Regiment of Guards and the 2nd battalion 5th Regiment which had been previously detached to march upon Schoorldam to keep up the communication with Sir James Pulteney, were joined by the remainder of the column, which, after taking Warmenhuizen, had been reinforced by the 1st battalion 5th Regiment, and the whole moved forward and seized the village. They held it under artillery fire until the conclusion of the action.

The left-centre column, though opposed by the bulk of the Batavian army, under General Daendels, had overcome all opposition and taken possession of Oudkarspel, thus securing the direct line of advance on Alkmaar. Sir Ralph Abercromby had equally well accomplished his task by capturing the town of Hoorn, on the coast of the Zuiderzee, and placing himself in a favourable position for completing the turning movement. However, in consequence of the partial failure on the right, it was considered necessary to recall all the troops and re-occupy the former position.

The strength of the column which attacked Bergen would have been more than sufficient if it had been employed correctly. This column was numerically superior to the enemy, but it moved in mass in an intersected country, did not cover its flanks, and its operations having, contrary to order, been commenced long before daylight, its fire was probably more destructive to itself than to the enemy. That the other columns were not too weak for their tasks is shown by their having taken and held, until recalled, the points against which they had been directed.

Losses 
The losses on both sides were considerable:

British: 6 officers, 2 sergeants, 109 rank-and-file killed; 43 officers, 20 sergeants, 2 drummers, 345 rank-and-file, wounded; 22 sergeants, 5 drummers, 463 rank-and-file, missing.
Russians: 1,741 non-commissioned officers, rank-and-file, and 44 officers, killed or captured.  1,225, including 49 officers, wounded.
Republicans: 3,000 prisoners, including 60 officers.  16 guns taken.

Aftermath 
The newly appointed Russian Commander-in-Chief, Mikhail Kutuzov, who was rushing from St. Petersburg to assume command of Russian forces, learned about the debacle at Hamburg and, deeming the campaign to be doomed, promptly returned to Russia.

The Republicans re-occupied all the positions from which they had been driven, and their general line of defence was now covered on the right by inundations, the only roads across which were covered by field works. The space between Alkmaar and the Zuiderzee was thus rendered defensible by small numbers, and Amsterdam was secured on the land side. The remainder of the army, which had been reinforced, was concentrated between the Langedijk and the sea, and the post of Oudkarspel was strengthened by additional works, and by inundations. Schoorldam and Koedijk were also fortified. The next major engagement took place at Castricum on 6 October.

References

Bibliography 
 Smith, Digby. The Napoleonic Wars Data Book. Greenhill, 1998.
The above text is an extract from an article compiled by the British Army's Intelligence branch of the Quartermaster-General's department in 1884.
 Flash-map of the Battle of Bergen-Binnen. 19 September 1799. D. Milutin. History of the War of 1799. SPb, 1857

External links

1799 in the Batavian Republic
Battles involving the Batavian Republic
Battles involving France
Battles involving Great Britain
Battles involving Russia
Battles of the French Revolutionary Wars
Conflicts in 1799
Bergen 1799
Bergen, North Holland